670 Ottegebe is a minor planet orbiting the Sun. In 2007 lightcurve data showed that Ottegebe rotates every 10.041 ± 0.002 hours. The name refers to a character in Gerhardt Hauptmann's play Der arme Heinrich.

References

External links 
 
 

000670
Discoveries by August Kopff
Named minor planets
000670
19080820